The Edo period of the history of Japan is the setting of many works of popular culture. These include novels, stage plays, films, television shows, animated works, manga, and video games. Major events of the period, such as the Siege of Osaka, Shimabara Rebellion, and the decline and fall of the Tokugawa shogunate figure prominently in many works. Historical and fictional people and groups of the period, including Miyamoto Musashi, Izumo no Okuni, Yagyū Jūbei Mitsuyoshi, the fictional Isshin Tasuke, Yui Shōsetsu, Matsuo Bashō, Tokugawa Mitsukuni (Mito Kōmon), Ōoka Tadasuke, Tōyama Kagemoto (Tōyama no Kin-san), the Forty-seven Ronin, Sakamoto Ryōma, Katsu Kaishū, and the Shinsengumi, as well as the fifteen Tokugawa shoguns were active for much or all of their public lives and are dramatized in works of popular culture. The cultural developments of the times, including kabuki, bunraku, and ukiyo-e, and practices like sankin kōtai and pilgrimages to the Ise Shrine, feature in many works set in Edo Japan.

Many popular works written during or following the Edo period were also set during the same period. Kabuki plays in contemporary settings were known as sewamono.

Some works span multiple media. The  has become popular in genres as diverse as kōdan, kabuki, stage plays, novels, films, television, manga, and anime.

Novels

Musashi by Eiji Yoshikawa
The Teahouse Fire by Ellis Avery
Shogun by James Clavell
Teito Gendan by Hiroshi Aramata
The Thousand Autumns of Jacob de Zoet by David Mitchell (author)

Stage plays
Pacific Overtures

Films

 Ansatsu ("Assassin")
 Aragami
 Azumi
 Azumi 2: Death or Love
 Chushingura: Hana no Maki, Yuki no Maki
 Daimajin trilogy
 Hanzo the Razor series
 Harakiri
 The Hidden Blade
 Incident at Blood Pass
 Kill!
 Kurama Tengu series
 Legend of the Eight Samurai
 Lone Wolf and Cub series
 Mayonaka no Yaji-san Kita-san (Yaji and Kita: The Midnight Pilgrims)
 Mibu gishi den (When the Last Sword Is Drawn)
 Rebel Samurai
 Ronin Gai
 Red Beard
 Samurai Assassin
 Samurai Rebellion
 Samurai Spy
 Samurai Trilogy
 Samurai Wolf
 Shinobi No Mono
 Shinsengumi
 Shogun's Vault
 Sword of Desperation
 Sword of Doom
 Sword of the Beast
 Sanjuro
 Seven Samurai
 Shogun Assassin
 Shogun's Shadow
 Tange Sazen series
 Tasogare Seibei (Twilight Samurai)
 The 47 Ronin
 When the Last_Sword Is Drawn
 Yagyu Ichizoku no Imbo
 Yojimbo
 Zatoichi film series
 Dancing skeleton

Television shows

 Abarenbo Shogun
 Chōshichirō Edo Nikki
 Edo no Taka: Goyôbeya Hankachô (Falcons of Edo)
 Edo o Kiru
Gokenin Zankurō
 Hissatsu series
 Jitte-nin
 Kage Dōshin
 Kage no Gundan (Shadow Warriors)
 Kenkaku Shōbai
 Lone Wolf and Cub - a live-actor television series based on the manga
 Mito Kōmon
 Moeyo Ken
 Momotarō-zamurai
 Ōedo Sōsamō
 Onihei Hanka-chō
 Onmitsu Kenshi (The Samurai)
 Ōoka Echizen
 Samurai Champloo
 Sanbiki ga Kiru!

 Shinsen gumi Keppūroku
 Shogun Iemitsu Shinobi Tabi
 Taiga drama (NHK annual series)
 Tenamon'ya Sando-gasa
 Tenga Dōdō
 Tenga Gomen
 Tōyama no Kin-san
 Westworld (Shōgunworld)
 Ude ni Oboe ga Aru 
 Zatoichi (television series)
 Zenigata Heiji

Anime
 Amatsuki - a manga and anime in which the main character gets stuck in a virtual Edo
 Ayakashi Ayashi - an anime series taking place during the Tenpō reforms
Bakumatsu Kikansetsu Irohanihoheto - an anime series centered around the Boshin War, with some supernatural/fantasy elements
Basilisk
Blade of the Immortal
Carried by the Wind: Tsukikage Ran
Gintama - a manga and anime series which takes place in an alternate Edo period where Edo is overrun by aliens called the Amanto.
Kaze Hikaru
Hakuouki
Manyuu Hikenchou
Ninja Scroll
Peacemaker Kurogane - an anime series focusing on a boy who joins the Shinsengumi
Rurouni Kenshin
Samurai Champloo
The Yagyu Ninja Scrolls
Nabari no Ou - While not set in the Edo Period, the immortal character Kouichi Aizawa lived and gained his immortality during it.
Oh! Edo Rocket

Manga
 Lone Wolf and Cub - a manga and television series
 Amatsuki - a manga and anime in which the main character gets stuck in a virtual Edo
 Ōoku: The Inner Chambers - a manga set in the Edo period in which a strange disease that only affects men has caused a massive reduction of male population
 The upcoming Code Geass: Jet Black Reyna is to be set in the Edo Period
 Nurarihyon no Mago - a manga and anime in which the main character's father had ruled during the Edo period as the second supreme commander
 Rurouni Kenshin - A manga about a lone rounin
 Hell's Paradise: Jigokuraku - A manga set in the Edo Period in which the main character went to another world for his wife.

Video games

 Ganbare Goemon - a Konami video game series that takes place in the Edo period.
 Odama - a Nintendo game that is a historical fiction in a Strategy-pinball genre.
 Hakuoki - a reverse harem otome video game the occurs towards the end of the Edo period, which also includes characters based on the Shinsengumi.
 Way of the Samurai series - a video game series that takes place in Edo as the player takes the role of a samurai
 Samurai Warriors - a video game series from Koei, using Dynasty Warriors mechanics to illustrate the beginning of the Japanese Edo period.
 Total War: Shogun 2 - a strategy video game.
 Shadow Tactics: Blades of the Shogun - a real-time tactics video game.
 Nioh
 Live A Live - a role-playing game set in multiple time periods, one chapter revolving around a shinobi rescuing Sakamoto Ryōma.
 Ryū ga Gotoku Kenzan! and Ryū ga Gotoku Ishin! - two spin-off games in the Yakuza (franchise) series, set in the Edo period. Ryū ga Gotoku Kenzan! centers on Miyamoto Musashi as the main character, and the main character of Ryū ga Gotoku Ishin! is Sakamoto Ryōma.

See also
Jidaigeki

Edo period
Japanese popular culture
Japan in fiction